Toy Story: The Musical was a rock musical inspired by Disney·Pixar's 1995 film Toy Story. The show was created by Walt Disney Creative Entertainment for Disney Cruise Line, replacing the earlier Hercules: The Muse-Ical. After a year of pre-production and workshops, it had a soft premiere on board the Disney Wonder in March 2008, with an official opening on April 10, 2008. The show was performed in the Walt Disney Theatre, the grand showplace located on Deck 4. 

A land debut was initially planned in the Hyperion Theater at Disney California Adventure, however the plans were later canceled. The musical spectacular for Frozen replaced plans for Toy Story at the Hyperion Theater starting on May 27, 2016.

The show was directed by Los Angeles-based director, Stefan Novinski, and choreographed by New York-based choreographer, Warren Adams. Throughout the 55-minute musical, there are 6 original songs, written by Valerie Vigoda and Brendan Milburn. It also features one song from the original soundtrack of the animated feature, "You've Got a Friend in Me", written by Randy Newman. Music direction and arranging was handled by Los Angeles-based music director, David O. The book was written by New-York based lyricist, Mindi Dickstein, who penned the lyrics for the Little Women musical on Broadway. Sets were designed by Los Angeles-based set designer, Sibyl Wickersheimer, costumes were created by Los Angeles-based avant garde costumer, Ann Closs-Farley, lighting was designed by New York-based designer, Jason Kantrowitz, and sound design was by Los Angeles-based designer Drew Dalzell.

Toy Story: The Musical follows the film's storyline, with certain theatrical liberties taken.

Order of musical numbers

 "You've Got a Friend in Me 1" – Opening Scene
 "That's Why We're Here 1" - Andy Davis Birthday
 "To Infinity and Beyond" – Meet Buzz Lightyear
 "One Toy" - Sheriff Woody Hate New Toys
 "The Claw" – Pizza Planet
 "Make a Little Noise 1" – Sid Philips Home 
 "Make a Little Noise 2" – Big One
 "That's Why We're Here 2" – Sheriff Woody and Buzz Lightyear
 "Make a Little Noise 3" - Sid Philips Make Blown Up Buzz Lightyear
 "Busted"/"Make a Lot of Noise" – Sid Philips Defeat
 "You've Got a Friend in Me 2"/"That's Why We're Here 3" – Ending Scene
 "Bows"/"To Infinity and Beyond 2" – End Credits

Original cast onboard Disney Wonder 
Woody – Geoffrey Tyler
Buzz Lightyear – Noel Orput
Andy – Laurel Hatfield
Rex – Mark Whitten, Wallace Shawn (voice)
Slinky Dog – Nicholas Nunez, Gabi Epstein,  Blake Clark (voice)
Mr. Potato Head – Melany Carruthers,  Don Rickles (voice)
Hamm – Ryan Naimy,  John Ratzenberger (voice)
Bo Peep – Isabelle Kiraly
Sarge – Andre Jordan
Barrel of Monkeys – Laurel Hatfield, Jessica Vandenberg, Andrew Wilson
Green Army Men – Ina Marie Smith, Todd Stroik
Buzz With Leaves – Katy Reinsel
Little Green Aliens – Andre Jordan, Isabelle Kiraly, Ina Marie Smith, Jessica Vandenberg, Andrew Wilson, Jeff Pidgeon (voice)
Sid - Rachel Fischer
Ptero-Janie – Ina Marie Smith
Mutant Army Man – Andre Jordan
Ducky – Katy Reinsel
Rollerbob – Laurel Hatfield
Babyhead – Todd Stroik
Legs – Jessica Vandenberg
Manhand – Andrew Wilson
Swings – Mark Donaldson, Alex Saslove
Understudies – Amanda Juhl, Julie Smith
Dance Captains – Mark Donaldson, Andrew Wilson
Vocal Captain – Laurel Hatfield

Closing cast onboard Disney Wonder

Woody – Patrick Pevehouse
Buzz Lightyear – Jeff Scot Carey
Andy – Keslie Ward
Sid – Melanie Burg
Rex – Jason Clarke, Wallace Shawn (voice)
Slinky Dog – Mitch McCarrell, Dani Westhead,  Blake Clark (voice)
Mr. Potato Head – Meghan Deeley,  Don Rickles (voice)
Hamm – Michael Karl,  John Ratzenberger (voice)
Bo Peep – Ester Stilwell
Sarge – Chris Teusch/Jamari Williams
Barrel of Monkeys – Mia Beasley, Andy Mills, Keslie Ward
Green Army Men – Kelsey Self, Andy Christopher
Buzz With Leaves – Jacki King
Little Green Aliens – Kelsey Self, Andy Mills, Mia Beasley, Ester Stilwell, Jeff Pidgeon (voice)
Ptero-Janie – Kelsey Self
Mutant Army Man – Chris Teusch/Jamari Williams
Ducky – Jacki King
Rollerbob – Keslie Ward
Babyhead – Andy Cristopher
Legs – Mia Beasley 
Manhand – Andy Mills
Swings – Chris Teusch, Hayley Alexander

References

External links
Toy Story: The Musical at Disney Cruise Line website

2008 musicals
Amusement rides that closed in 2016
Musical
Walt Disney Parks and Resorts entertainment
Disney Cruise Line
Pixar in amusement parks
Musicals based on animated films
Rock musicals